Simon Kaipuram (9 February 1954 – 22 April 2019) was an Indian Roman Catholic bishop.

Kaipuram was born in India and was ordained to the priesthood in 1980. He served as bishop of the Roman Catholic Diocese of Balasore from 2013 until his death in 2019.

Notes

1954 births
2019 deaths
21st-century Roman Catholic bishops in India